František Rint (26 January 1835 - ?) was a 19th-century Czech woodcarver and carpenter. He was employed by the House of Schwarzenberg to organize the human bones interred at the Sedlec Ossuary, a small Christian chapel in Sedlec, in 1870. He used the bones at Sedlec Ossuary to create elaborate, macabre sculptures, including four chandeliers and a copy of the Schwarzenberg coat of arms. According to the signature he left at the Ossuary, Rint was from Česká Skalice, a small town in northern Bohemia.

References

1835 births
Year of death missing
Czech sculptors
Czech male sculptors
People from Česká Skalice